Incheon Heungkuk Life Insurance Pink Spiders is a South Korean women's professional volleyball team. The team was founded in 1971 and became fully professional in 2005. They are based in Incheon and are members of the Korea Volleyball Federation (KOVO). Their home arena is Samsan World Gymnasium in Incheon.

Honours 
V-League
Champions (4): 2005−06, 2006−07, 2008−09, 2018–19
Runners-up (4): 2007−08, 2010−11, 2016–17, 2020–21
KOVO Cup
Winners (1): 2010
Runners-up (1): 2020

Season-by-season records

Players

2022−23 team

External links 
 Official website  

Volleyball clubs established in 1971
Sport in Incheon
Women's volleyball teams in South Korea
Taekwang Group
1971 establishments in South Korea